Polylepis pepei is a species of plant in the family Rosaceae. It is found in Bolivia and Peru. It is threatened by habitat loss.

References

pepei
Flora of the Andes
Páramo flora
Vulnerable plants
Trees of Bolivia
Trees of Peru
Taxonomy articles created by Polbot